28 Cordis Street is a historic house located in Wakefield, Massachusetts. It is significant as a well-preserved example of the Greek Revival style houses built during the early to mid 19th century.

Description and history 
It is a -story wood-frame structure, five bays wide, with a side gable roof and a hip-roofed wraparound porch. Its main entrance is flanked by sidelight windows. It was built c. 1835–45, and features rare original fluted Doric columns supporting its porch.

The house was added to the National Register of Historic Places on July 6, 1989, at which time it also featured a rare period fence; this feature has since been lost.

See also 
 National Register of Historic Places listings in Wakefield, Massachusetts
 National Register of Historic Places listings in Middlesex County, Massachusetts

References 

Houses on the National Register of Historic Places in Wakefield, Massachusetts
Houses completed in 1840
Houses in Wakefield, Massachusetts
Greek Revival architecture in Massachusetts